The Law Commissions Act 1965 (1965 c. 22) was an Act which created the Law Commission of England and Wales and the Scottish Law Commission, tasked with reviewing English and Scots law respectively.

Background
During the Victorian era, successive Lord Chancellors made an effort to reform the law; as Gerald Dworkin writes, "there was hardly one of the Victorian Lord Chancellors who did not have something to his credit in the sphere of legal reform." During the twentieth century this changed, with Lord Chancellors not having the time or energy to add law reform to their host of judicial and political duties. Lord Sankey did set up the Law Reform Commission, which led directly to the English and Scottish Law Commissions.

Lord Gardiner convinced Harold Wilson to add law reform to the Labour Party manifesto for the 1964 general election, and when the Labour Party were returned to power, Gardiner made a promise to set up a Law Commission a requirement for his acceptance of the post of Lord Chancellor. The Law Commissions Bill was introduced to Parliament on 20 January 1965, receiving its second reading on 8 February and the Royal Assent on 15 June, a remarkably fast passage of a bill.

Act
The Act created two Commissions; the Law Commission of England and Wales to review English law and the Scottish Law Commission to review Scots law. The English commission has five Commissioners, including a Chairman, all appointed by the Lord Chancellor. The Commissioners are to have experience working in the legal profession, by legal academics or be members of the judiciary. Each Commissioner sits for five years, although they may resign at any point and still be eligible for reappointment. The Scots Commission has a similar make-up.

The Commissions' duties are:
to consider any proposals for law reform given or directed to them;
to prepare recommendations for programs of law reform;
to prepare draft bills or other documents for such programs;
to prepare statute law revision or consolidation programs;
to provide legal advice to government departments concerning law reform;
to examine the legal systems of other nations to obtain any information that would facilitate programs of law reform.

The Law Commissions are assisted by parliamentary draftsmen, research and administrative assistants and officials from the Government Legal Service.

See also
Law Commission of England and Wales
Scottish Law Commission

References

Bibliography
Primary Sources

Secondary Sources

Halsbury's Statutes. Fourth Edition. 2008 Reissue. Volume 41. Page 767.

United Kingdom Acts of Parliament 1965
Law commissions
Law reform in the United Kingdom